Phenylalanine N-monooxygenase (phenylalanine N-hydroxylase, CYP79A2) is an enzyme with systematic name L-phenylalanine,NADPH:oxygen oxidoreductase (N-hydroxylating). This enzyme catalyses the following chemical reaction

 L-phenylalanine + 2 O2 + 2 NADPH + 2 H+  (E)-phenylacetaldoxime + 2 NADP+ + CO2 + 3 H2O (overall reaction)
(1a) L-phenylalanine + O2 + NADPH + H+  N-hydroxy-L-phenylalanine + NADP+ + H2O:
(1b) N-hydroxy-L-phenylalanine + O2 + NADPH + H+  N,N-dihydroxy-L-phenylalanine + NADP+ + H2O
(1c) N,N-dihydroxy-L-phenylalanine  (E)-phenylacetaldoxime + CO2 + H2O

Phenylalanine N-monooxygenase is a heme-thiolate protein (P-450). It is part of the pathway in plants which converts phenylalanine to the glucosinolate, glucotropaeolin, which contributes to the characteristic flavor of  brassicas.

References

External links 
 

EC 1.14.13